Mochdre & Pabo railway station was located on the eastern edge of the village of Mochdre, Conwy (historically Denbighshire).

History
Opened 1 April 1889 by the London and North Western Railway, it was served by what is now the North Wales Coast Line between Chester, Cheshire and Holyhead, Anglesey. It was the location of experimental trackside water troughs, from which passing steam locomotives could scoop up fresh water supplies without having to stop. These devices became commonplace around the world, but Mochdre was the first place they were ever used, starting in 1860 before moving to Aber in 1871.

The station had two platforms made of wood upon which were only very basic waiting facilities and a signal box. As with many other lightly patronised stops of the time, it was closed during World War I for austerity purposes between 1 January 1917 and 5 May 1919. The station struggled on until it closed on 5 January 1931. The line continued to run through the station until 1983, when the railway route was realigned, and the station site covered by, the A55.

References

Further reading

Disused railway stations in Denbighshire
Former London and North Western Railway stations
Railway stations in Great Britain opened in 1889
Railway stations in Great Britain closed in 1917
Railway stations in Great Britain opened in 1919
Railway stations in Great Britain closed in 1931